The Oxford Companion to English Literature first published in 1932, edited by the retired diplomat Sir Paul Harvey (1869–1948), was the earliest of the Oxford Companions to appear.  It is currently in its seventh edition (2009), edited by Dinah Birch.  The work, which has been periodically updated, includes biographies of prominent historical and leading contemporary writers in the English language, entries on major works, "allusions which may be encountered", significant (serial) publications and literary clubs. Writers in other languages are included when they have affected the anglophone world.  The Companion achieved "classic status" with the expanded fifth edition edited by novelist and scholar Margaret Drabble, and the book was often referred to as "The Drabble".

Harvey's entries concerning Sir Walter Scott, much admired by Drabble in the introduction to the fifth edition, were reduced for reasons of space, in the sixth edition.

Modern technology has meant that the two most recent editions have been updated at intervals of about five years before more radical changes are made; a revised printing of the sixth edition was published in 2006. The revised 2000 edition is now available in the Oxford Reference Online series by subscription only.

Editions
First edition, 1932 edited by Sir Paul Harvey
Second, 1937 edited by Harvey
Third, 1948, edited by Harvey
Fourth, 1967 revised by Dorothy S. Eagle
Fifth 1985 edited by Margaret Drabble
Sixth 2000 edited by Drabble
Seventh 2009 edited by Dinah Birch

References

External links
The Oxford Companion to English Literature 

1932 non-fiction books
Oxford University Press reference books
Encyclopedias of literature
English-language literature